Petr Nekuda (born 27 April 1990 in Olomouc) is a professional Czech football player. Nekuda plays mostly as a striker, and is currently playing for Prostějov in the Czech National Football League.

References
 Profile at iDNES.cz
 Zbrojovka Profile
 Eurofotbal Profile

1990 births
Living people
Sportspeople from Olomouc
Czech footballers
Czech First League players
FC Zbrojovka Brno players
Association football forwards